The 3rd Infantry Division (III Merarchia Pezikou, III MP) was an infantry division of the Hellenic Army.

History
The 3rd Infantry Division was established by Royal Decree on 8 September 1900 at Missolonghi, comprising the 5th Infantry Brigade at Missolonghi with 6th and 10th Infantry Regiments, and the 6th Infantry Brigade at Nafplio with 8th and 9th Infantry Regiments, plus the 3rd Cavalry Regiment, the 3rd Artillery Regiment, and the 3rd Evzone Battalion. In December 1901, the seats of the brigades changed, with 5th Brigade moving to Corfu and 6th Brigade to Kalamata. On 9 September 1904, as part of a major army reorganization, the 3rd Division's component units were fixed as: 5th Brigade at Missolonghi, comprising 6th Regiment (Missolonghi) and 10th Regiment (Corfu); 6th Brigade at Patras, comprising 9th Regiment (Kalamata) and 12th Regiment (Patras); and the 3rd and 7th Evzone Battalions (Arta), 3rd Cavalry Regiment, 3rd Field Artillery Regiment, 3rd Engineers Battalion, 3rd Train Company and 3rd Nursing Company, and the 3rd Military Music Command.

In January 1912, the brigades were abolished and divisions organized as triangular divisions. The 3rd Division remained at Missolonghi, but now comprised 6th Regiment (Missolonghi), 10th Regiment (Corfu), and 12th Regiment (Patras), plus supporting units.

Balkan Wars
At the outbreak of the First Balkan War in October 1912, the division was commanded by Major General Konstantinos Damianos. Consisting of three infantry regiments (6th, 10th and 12th), two squadrons of field artillery (1/3rd and 2/3rd), and one mountain artillery squadron (3rd), it was attached to the Army of Thessaly, commanded by Crown Prince Constantine.

During the Battle of Sarantaporo on 9 October 1912, the 3rd Infantry Division, along with the 1st and 2nd, executed a frontal attack on Ottoman forces, across open ground. The Greek divisions suffered heavy casualties due to enemy artillery in the advance, but by night had reached the Turkish lines. Ottoman forces retreated when the 4th Infantry Division attacked the western flank of the Turkish Army and captured the Porta Pass.

World War I
From 25 April 1918, the division fought in World War I on the Macedonian front, and remained active in the area around Lake Prespa until August 1920, when it was transferred to the Asia Minor Campaign.

Greco-Turkish War
In November 1920, the 3rd Infantry Division was part of the Army of Asia Minor during the Greco-Turkish War, assigned to the III Army Corps. Consisting of two infantry regiments (6th and 12th) and one light infantry regiment (2/39 Evzone), the division fought in the Battle of Sakarya and the Battle of Dumlupınar.

Interwar period
The 3rd Division was based at Patras as part of I Army Corps. By 14 October 1940 it was in the reserve of the Greek Army's three-corps defence against Italy during the Greco-Italian War.

References

Sources
 
 

Infantry divisions of Greece
Military units and formations of Greece in World War I
Military units and formations of Greece in World War II
1900 establishments in Greece
Military units and formations established in 1900
Military units and formations of Greece in the Greco-Turkish War (1919–1922)
Military units and formations of Greece in the Balkan Wars